Hundige station is a station on the Køge radial of the S-train network in Copenhagen, Denmark. It is situated close to the WAVES shopping center.

Hundige station opened along with the extension of the Køge radial from Vallensbæk station to Hundige in 1976: Since then, it has been the terminus of the S-train service A, and a stop on all other lines on the Køge radial. Hundige station is however now only an occasional terminus for service A, since in the daytime on weekdays, every second train in the service continues to Solrød Strand station.

Hundige station is a hub for public transportation in its area; right next to the platforms and tracks, is an array of designated bus stops for each of several bus lines serving the area, a pick-up and drop-off zone for taxis and private vehicles, and a parking lot.

See also
 List of railway stations in Denmark

References

External links

S-train (Copenhagen) stations
Railway stations opened in 1976
Railway stations in Denmark opened in the 20th century